Richard Abraham was an English politician who was MP for Portsmouth in 1372, January 1377, and February 1383. History of Parliament Online claims that he was a relation of Henry Abraham.

References

English MPs 1372
English MPs January 1377
English MPs February 1383
Members of the Parliament of England (pre-1707) for Portsmouth